Georges Montefiore-Levi (18 February 1832 – 24 April 1906) was a Belgian politician, industrialist and inventor of Jewish extraction who created the first phosphorus bronze.

Early life
He was born in Streatham, South London. His father, Isaac Levi, was a merchant, and his mother was a first cousin of financier Moses Montefiore.

Career
A businessman and an active philanthropist, Montefiore-Levi represented Liège in the Senate from 1882 to 1901, and he was the president of the 1892 international monetary conference that met in Brussels.

Montefiore-Levi founded one of Belgium's oldest engineering schools, the Institut Montefiore in Liège, and it later became part of the University of Liège. He also established an asylum for convalescent children in Esneux that he named after his wife. He had an interest in photography and was once president of the Belgian Association of Photography. He improved existing technology so that it was possible to take up to fifteen wax-paper negatives without opening a camera, and he introduced a canopy that allowed for the immediate processing of collodion negatives.

In 1866, he married , daughter of Jonathan-Raphaël Bischoffsheim. He died at his home in Brussels in 1906.

References

External links

 Full-length biography from the Royal Academy of Science, Letters and Fine Arts of Belgium (in French)
 Tribute from L'Association Belge de Photographie (in French)
 Institut Montefiore

1832 births
1906 deaths
19th-century Belgian inventors
19th-century Belgian Jews
20th-century Belgian Jews
Belgian Sephardi Jews
Levites
Georges
Members of the Senate (Belgium)
Belgian industrialists